Langah,, is a village in the Chakwal District of Punjab, Pakistan. It is a very old village.
Langah is a village of UC Jand Awan on the eastern part of Chakwal, surrounded by Dhoda, Jand, Dumali and Hasola.

References 

Populated places in Chakwal District